Bevin may refer to:

People

Given name 
 Bevin Alexander (born 1929), military historian and author
 Bevin Fortuin (born 1979), rugby union player and head coach
 Bevin Hough (1929–2019), New Zealand sportsman
 Bevin Kelley, birth name of musician Blevin Blectum
 Bevin McKinney, key person at Rotary Rocket Company
 Bevin Prince (born 1982), American actress

Surname 
 Ernest Bevin (1881–1951), British politician and statesman
 Bevin Boys, young British men conscripted to work in coal mines
 Fred Bevin (1880–1940), English footballer
 James Bevin (died 1946), Anglican priest in the 20th century
 Kerry Bevin, New Zealand politician
 Matt Bevin (born 1967), American businessman and politician; former governor of Kentucky (2015–2019)
 Michael Bevin (born 1977), New Zealand field hockey goalkeeper
 Patrick Bevin (born 1991), New Zealand professional road cyclist

Characters 
 Bevin Evan Mirskey, One Tree Hill character

Places

Real places 
 Bevin Court, housing project in London
 Bevin Glacier, Antarctican glacier
 Bevin House, Victorian mansion on Long Island
 Mount Bevin, Antarctican mountain

Fictional places 
 Bevin, a neighbourhood of the D'ni caverns in the Myst franchise of computer games

See also 
 Beavan
 Bevan
 Bevins